Hanriot is a French aircraft manufacturer.

Hanriot may also refer to:
 François Hanriot (1761–1794), leader and street orator of the French Revolution
 Marcel Hanriot, pilot, show flyer and director of Hanriot
 René Hanriot, founder of the Hanriot aircraft company